Nänikon-Greifensee is a railway station in the Swiss canton of Zürich. It is situated between the villages of Nänikon, in the municipality of Uster, and the town of Greifensee. The station is on the Wallisellen–Uster–Rapperswil line.

Service 
Nänikon-Greifensee station is served by Zürich S-Bahn lines S9 and S14. During weekends, there is also a nighttime S-Bahn service (SN9) offered by ZVV. Rail services are summarized as follows:

 Zürich S-Bahn:
 Nighttime S-Bahn (only during weekends):

References

External links 

 

Railway stations in the canton of Zürich
Swiss Federal Railways stations
railway